Sorbus lancastriensis, the Lancashire whitebeam, is a species of deciduous tree or shrub in the family Rosaceae, growing to . It is endemic to England, and is found within a  radius from Morecambe Bay, in Lancashire.  It is threatened by habitat loss. It has oval leaves. White blossom in spring is followed by orange to red berries in autumn.

References

lancastriensis
Endemic flora of England
Lancashire
Near threatened plants
Near threatened biota of Europe
Taxonomy articles created by Polbot